Hans Otto Jung (17 September 1920 – 22 April 2009) was a German viticulturist, jazz musician and patron of music. In the 1940s, he played as a pianist in the Hotclub Combo, which he cofounded with Emil Mangelsdorff and others. In 1987, he was a cofounder of the Rheingau Musik Festival. With his wife Ursula Jung, he sponsored cultural initiatives in the Rhein-Main region.

Life and career 
Born in Lorch, Jung grew up in a musical family; his father Carl Jung, a viticulturist, organized regular chamber music concerts in Rüdesheim, with notable performers and composers who were personal friends of the family. Paul Hindemith composed a ragtime to congratulate to the birth of Hans Otto, titled Young Lorch Fellow. Ragtime.

Jung learned to play the piano with  among others, and later the violin and the viola, performing in public for the first time in 1935. He studied social sciences in Frankfurt. In 1943, he also learned to play the double bass, and served as the group's bassist from 1945 to 1948 in the Hotclub Sextet. The broadcaster Hessischer Rundfunk aired in 1946/47 a show with him as the solo pianist, playing in the style of Teddy Wilson.

He completed his studies with a Ph.D. in business administration (Betriebswirtschaft). He directed the family's winery, which focused on the production of alcohol-free wines and brandy, but still often listened to jazz concerts and chamber music concerts in the Rhein-Main region. He often invited performers, especially pianists, to play at his residence Boosenburg, where he had two Steinway pianos.

Jung was the president of the Wiesbaden association of artists and art lovers (Verein der Künstler und Kunstfreunde) from 1976. In 1987, he was a cofounder and patron of the Rheingau Musik Festival. Together with his wife Ursula, a historian, he was a patron of culture in the region, sponsoring institutions such a chamber music series and "Brahmstage" in Rüdesheim, the concert series "Die Kammermusik" in Wiesbaden, and Dr. Hoch's Konservatorium and the Hochschule für Musik und Darstellende Kunst in Frankfurt.

He had an accident in the winter 2008/09 when he attended a concert of his friend Menahem Pressler in Hamburg, and died in Rüdesheim. His residence still serves as a location of regular jazz and chamber music concerts, organized by his son Edu and the town of Rüdesheim.

Lexicon entry 
 Carlo Bohländer, Reclams Jazzführer Stuttgart 1970

References

External links 
 Hans-Otto Jung (1941) (photo 1941) Marburg University
 Das älteste Jazzfestival der Welt / So fing's an Hessischer Rundfunk

German viticulturists
German jazz pianists
German patrons of music
People from the Kingdom of Prussia
1920 births
2009 deaths
20th-century pianists
20th-century philanthropists
People from the Rheingau